Bay City Christian School is a school in Green Bay, Wisconsin affiliated with the Bay City Baptist Church of Green Bay. It includes preschool through 12th grade. The school is a member of the Wisconsin Association of Christian Schools (WACS).

History
In spring 2016, BCCS applied to become a part of the Wisconsin private school voucher program.

Extracurricular activities
Soccer, basketball and volleyball are offered at BCCS. The school also offers drama opportunities and American Christian Honor Society.

References

External links
Bay City Christian School

High schools in Green Bay, Wisconsin
Private high schools in Wisconsin
Private middle schools in Wisconsin
Private elementary schools in Wisconsin